Darbhanga Assembly constituency is an assembly constituency in Darbhanga district in the Indian state of Bihar.  In 2015 Bihar Legislative Assembly election, Darbhanga will be one of the 36 seats to have VVPAT.

Overview
As per Delimitation of Parliamentary and Assembly constituencies Order, 2008, No. 83 Darbhanga Assembly constituency is composed of the following: Darbhanga municipal corporation; Kabir Chak, Kansi, Ranipur, Sara Mahamad, Shisho East, Shisho West, Basudeopur, Sahbajpur gram panchayats of Darbhanga community development block.

Darbhanga Assembly constituency is part of No. 14 Darbhanga (Lok Sabha constituency).

Members of Legislative Assembly

Election results

2020

2015

References

External links
 

Assembly constituencies of Bihar
Politics of Darbhanga district